Landak Regency is a regency of West Kalimantan province, Indonesia.  It was created in 1999 from the northeastern part of Pontianak Regency. It covers 9,909.10 km2 and had a population of 329,649 at the 2010 Census and 397,610 at the 2020 Census; the official estimate as at mid 2021 was 401,103. The principal town lies at Ngabang. Landak is also one of the four regencies in West Kalimantan whose population is predominantly Catholic, the others being  Sanggau,  Sekadau, and  Sintang.

Administrative Districts 
Landak Regency consists of thirteen districts (kecamatan), tabulated below with their areas and their populations at the 2010 Census and the 2020 Census, together with the official estimates as at mid 2021. The table also includes the locations of the district administrative centres, the number of administrative villages (rural desa and urban kelurahan) in each district and its post code.

Climate
Ngabang, the seat of the regency has a tropical rainforest climate (Af) with heavy rainfall year-round.

References

Regencies of West Kalimantan